Sadar is a town and a tehsil in Pratapgarh district in the Indian state of Uttar Pradesh.

References

Cities and towns in Pratapgarh district, Uttar Pradesh